Ananda Thuriya was the first governor of Kanba Myint, the region that would later become the Principality of Toungoo (Taungoo), the predecessor state of the Toungoo dynasty. The governor started out his career in the military service of King Sithu II of Pagan (Bagan), rising to commander-in-chief of the royal army. He later became a chief minister at the royal court, and married a daughter of the king. In 1191, he was appointed governor of Kanba Myint, (modern Taungoo District), then a frontier region. He was the paternal great grandfather of Thawun Gyi and Thawun Nge, who founded Toungoo in 1279.

Brief
The royal chronicles say nothing about his early life except for his personal name, Yanman Nga Htwe. Based on his honorific, Yanman, he was likely an ethnic Mon. The first mention of him the chronicles is as a member of the security detail of King Sithu II (r. 1174–1211). Chronicles say that Htwe made his name one day when the king was sailing upriver from Pagan (Bagan), and the royal barge was attacked by a large crocodile. Htwe jumped into the river, and wrestled the crocodile and killed it with the royal sceptre.

The grateful king appointed him an officer in his army. There, Htwe served with distinction. He started out leading small expeditions to put down minor rebellions, and later became a commander leading major expeditions to more remote regions. Chronicles say that he proved to be a successful commander, and usually brought home the rebel leader. Legends grew about his bravery: He supposedly wrestled and killed a tiger, and an elephant on separate occasions. For his battlefield successes, the king rewarded him by granting a senior court title, Ananda Thuriya (Pali: Ananta Suriya), and his teenage daughter Saw Min Hla in marriage. The minister-general built the Laymyethna Temple in Pagan, inscribing a curse on all those who should injure his dedication.

According to the Toungoo region's chronicle Toungoo Yazawin, in 1191, Ananda Thuriya was given in fief a frontier region called Kanba Myint (ကမ်းပါးမြင့်), a small settlement on the Swa, a tributary to the Paunglaung river. The king made the appointment while travelling through the region on his return trip from Pegu (Bago) in the south. He observed that the hitherto frontier region, about 250 km from the Mon-speaking Pegu, was now populated with Mon and Burmese speakers, and decided to closely administer the region. According to historian Sein Lwin Lay, the king likely considered his son-in-law Ananda Thuriya, a proven military commander and probably an ethnic Mon (based on his name), a perfect fit for the region.

Except for a couple of pagoda renovations, not much is known about his years as governor at Kanba Myint. He died in an unknown year, and was succeeded by his son Min Hla Saw. In 1279, two of his great grandsons Thawun Gyi and Thawun Nge founded Toungoo (Taungoo), about 40 km south of Kanba Myint. Toungoo became the principal city of the region by the early 14th century.

Notes

References

Bibliography
 
 
 
 
 
 
 
 

Ministers of Pagan dynasty
Year of birth unknown
Year of death unknown
12th-century births
Burmese generals
Burmese people of Mon descent
12th-century Burmese people
13th-century Burmese people